The World Allround Speed Skating Championships for Men took place on 12 and 13 March 1994 in Gothenburg at the Ruddalens IP ice rink.

Title holder was the Netherlander Falko Zandstra. This was Johann Olav Koss third title.

Classification

 * = Fell

Source:

References

World Allround Speed Skating Championships, 1994
1994 World Allround

Attribution
In Dutch